Stavros (Stavrós) is a town and a community of the Volvi municipality. Before the 2011 local government reform it was part of the municipality of Egnatia, of which it was a municipal district. The 2011 census recorded 3,672 inhabitants in the town. The community of Stavros covers an area of 16.50 km2.

See also
 List of settlements in the Thessaloniki regional unit

References

Populated places in Thessaloniki (regional unit)